Mount Artos is a mountain (dormant volcano) in Van Province in eastern Turkey.
It has a height of 3,515 meters above sea level, and is located at 38° 27' 1 N, 43° 29' 30 E.

References 

Landforms of Van Province
Artos
Three-thousanders of Turkey